The Poland women's national under-18 volleyball team represents Poland in international women's volleyball competitions and friendly matches under the age 18 and it is ruled by the Polish Volleyball Federation That is an affiliate of Federation of International Volleyball FIVB and also a part of European Volleyball Confederation CEV.

History

Results

FIVB U19 World Championship
 Champions   Runners up   Third place   Fourth place

Europe U18 / U17 Championship
 Champions   Runners up   Third place   Fourth place

Team

Current squad

The following is the Polish roster in the 2017 FIVB Girls' U18 World Championship.

Head coach: Rafal Gasior

See also
Poland women's team
Poland women's U18 team
Poland women's U20 team
Poland women's U23 team
Poland men's team

References

External links
Official website 
FIVB profile

 
 

National women's under-18 volleyball teams
Volleyball
Volleyball in Poland